Duan Shuqing (c. 1510c. 1600) was a Chinese poet of the Ming dynasty.

Life
Born in Dangtu County in Anhui to a scholarly family, her father Duan Tingbi taught her how to read. She traveled with him and read many of the classics, especially the Lienü zhuan. She married the Confucian scholar Rui Ru.

She wrote different styles of verse and they were said to follow Tang Dynasty poetry models. One of her poems, Taibai Tower, was dedicated to Li Bai, a famous poet of that age.

Notes

Sources

Chinese women poets
16th-century Chinese women writers
Ming dynasty poets
1510 births
1600 deaths
People from Ma'anshan
Poets from Anhui
16th-century Chinese poets